Gwenview is an image viewer for Unix-like systems (including Linux) and is released as part of the KDE Applications bundle. The current maintainer is Aurélien Gâteau. The word "Gwen" means "white" in the Breton language and is commonly used as a first name.

History 
Gwenview was first available for K Desktop Environment 3. Later it was released as part of the KDE Software Compilation 4 with a simplified user interface, making it more suitable for quickly browsing through collection of images. It also provided a full-screen interface that can be used to display images as a slide-show. In 2014, Gwenview was ported to KDE Frameworks 5 and released as part of KDE Applications.

Features 
Major features include:
 Directory browser
 Raster image (including but not limited to BMP, PNG, JPEG, GIF, MNG, TIFF, and PSD), SVG, RAW (limited), and video support
 Easy to use interface
 Metadata comment editor
 Thumbnail image view of current directory
 Import images from external storage
 Use of KIPI (KDE Image Plugins Interface) plugins for manipulating images
 Filtering based on file type, file name pattern, and date.
 Share images to social networking sites

See also 
 Comparison of image viewers
 digiKam
 gThumb

References

External links 

 

Applications using D-Bus
Free image viewers
Graphics software that uses Qt
KDE Applications